Dr. Flavius Charles Killebrew (born April 2, 1949) is a former American academic administrator. He was the 10th President of the Texas A&M University–Corpus Christi. He was appointed to the office in January 2005, in a unanimous vote by the Board of Regents of The Texas A&M University System. Prior to his appointment, Killebrew was Provost and Vice President for Academic Affairs at West Texas A&M University in Canyon, Texas.

Prior Employment 

 1976 – Assistant Professor of Biology, West Texas A&M University
 1988 – Professor of Biology, West Texas A&M University
 1994-2004 – Provost and Vice President for Academic Affairs, West Texas A&M University

Education 

 1971 – Bachelor's Degree, West Texas A&M University
 1972 – Master's Degree, West Texas A&M University
 1976 – Ph.D. in Zoology, University of Arkansas at Fayetteville

Miscellaneous 

Member of American Association of State Colleges and Universities
Member of Texas International Education Consortium

Personal life 
Killibree is married to Kathy Bartley and has one daughter.

References 

1949 births
Living people
People from Corpus Christi, Texas
West Texas A&M University alumni
University of Arkansas alumni
West Texas A&M University faculty
Texas A&M University–Corpus Christi
Presidents of Texas A&M University